Ganadabi (People's Demand) is a weekly Bengali newspaper published from Kolkata, West Bengal, India. The paper is the Bengali organ of Socialist Unity Centre of India (Communist), a communist party in India.

See also 
 Ganashakti
 Jago Bangla
 Proletarian Era

References

External links 
  

Newspapers published in Kolkata
Bengali-language newspapers published in India
Communist periodicals published in India
Year of establishment missing